Piopolis may refer to:

 Piopolis, Illinois, United States
 Piopolis, Quebec, Canada